The World Rugby Hall of Fame (formerly the IRB Hall of Fame) recognises special achievement and contribution to the sport of rugby union. The World Rugby Hall of Fame covers players, coaches, administrators, match officials, institutions and other individuals. The Hall of Fame recognises the history and important contributions to the game, through one or more induction ceremonies that have been held annually except in 2010. The permanent physical home of the Hall of Fame was based at the Rugby Art Gallery, Museum & Library in Rugby, Warwickshire from 2016 until 2021.

History
The Hall of Fame was introduced by the International Rugby Board (as World Rugby was then known) during the 2006 IRB Awards ceremony in Glasgow, Scotland. The inaugural inductees were William Webb Ellis, who apocryphally caught the ball during a football game and ran with it, and Rugby School, which has left a huge legacy with the game in a number of ways.

The second induction to the Hall of Fame took place in Paris on 21 October 2007, the night after the 2007 Rugby World Cup Final. The next induction was in London on 23 November 2008.

The third induction, in which nine figures entered the Hall, was held on 27 October 2009 at Rugby School. The voting process for the class of 2009 was geared toward the history of British & Irish Lions tours to South Africa, the most recent of which took place in that year; all of the candidates were either Lions or Springboks.

For 2011, induction ceremonies were held at various locations around the world, with the year's final ceremony taking place as part of the 2011 IRB Awards on 24 October in Auckland, the day after the Rugby World Cup Final in that city. The inductions at the Auckland ceremony, according to the IRB, were "under the theme of Rugby World Cup founders, visionaries and iconic figures," and were made in three groups—first for the founders of the RWC, then all World Cup-winning captains and coaches through the 2007 World Cup (minus John Eales, inducted in 2007), and finally other iconic players of the World Cup.

The pattern begun in 2011 was repeated in 2012, with six induction ceremonies being held in six countries. As in the two previous induction cycles, the 2012 inductions had an overriding theme; "Rugby - A Global Game". According to the IRB, it "celebrates Rugby’s expansion to become a global sport played by millions of men and women worldwide."

On 31 July 2014, the IRB announced that its Hall would merge with the separate International Rugby Hall of Fame later in 2014. The merger saw the 37 members of the International Hall who had not already been honoured by the IRB formally enter the World Rugby Hall of Fame in 2014 and 2015. The 2014 class of inductees also included six women.

On 19 November the IRB rebranded as World Rugby, and the Hall of Fame became known as the World Rugby Hall Of Fame.

Inductees

See also
 International Rugby Hall of Fame – merged into the World Rugby Hall of Fame in 2014 and 2015 
 World Rugby Museum – a celebration of the best international players to have played at Twickenham Stadium

Footnotes

References

External links
World Rugby Hall of Fame

History of rugby union
Rugby union museums and halls of fame
Awards established in 2006
Hall
Halls of fame in the Republic of Ireland